"Fools like Me" is a song by Jerry Lee Lewis, who released it as a single, with "High School Confidential" on the other side, in 1958 on Sun Records.

According to Joe Bonomo's book Jerry Lee Lewis: Lost and Found, the song was a top-10 country hit.

Track listing

Charts

Covers 
The song was performed by The Beatles and by John Lennon with Yoko Ono.

References 

1958 songs
1958 singles
Jerry Lee Lewis songs
Sun Records singles

American country music songs
American rock-and-roll songs
The Beatles songs
John Lennon songs
Songs written by Jack Clement